The sixth season of the reality television series Basketball Wives aired on VH1 from April 17, 2017 until August 14, 2017. The season was primarily filmed in Los Angeles, California. It was executively produced by Nick Emmerson, Alex Demyanenko, Shaunie O'Neal, Jill Holmes, Tom Huffman, and Sean Rankine. 

The show chronicles the lives of a group of women who are the wives and girlfriends, or have been romantically linked to, professional basketball players in the National Basketball Association, though the title of the series does not make this differentiation, solely referring to the women as "wives".

Production
Basketball Wives debuted on April 11, 2010, with thirty-minute episodes. The second season premiered on December 12, 2010, with expanded sixty-minute episodes and featured new cast member Tami Roman. Season 3 made its debut on May 30, 2011, with new cast member Meeka Claxton. The fourth season premiered on February 20, 2012, with two new cast members, Kenya Bell and Kesha Nichols and the departure of Claxton. The fifth season premiered on August 19, 2013, with Tasha Marbury joining the cast. According to a tweet from Tami Roman, the show has been quietly though officially cancelled.

On March 27, 2017, VH1 announced that the series would be returning after nearly four years off-air on April 17, with Evelyn Lozada, Shaunie O'Neal, Tami Roman, Jackie Christie and Malaysia Pargo returning to the franchise. Brandi Maxiell, Elena Ahanzadeh, Saniy'yah Samaa, Keonna Green, Bonnie-Jill Laflin, Aja, Christen and Melissa Metoyer  are also set to join the series as recurring cast members.

Cast

Main Cast
Jackie Christie: Wife of Doug Christie
Malaysia Pargo: Ex-Wife of Jannero Pargo
Evelyn Lozada: Ex-Fiancée of Carl Crawford
Tami Roman: Ex-Wife of Kenny Anderson
Shaunie O'Neal: Ex-Wife of Shaquille O’Neal

Recurring Cast
Brandi Maxiell: Wife of Jason Maxiell
Saniy'yah Samaa: Stylist
Cristen Metoyer: Girlfriend of Joe Crawford
Aja Metoyer: Cristen’s sister
Elena Ahanzadeh 
Keonna Green: Ex-Girlfriend of Nick Young 
Bonnie-Jill Laflin: Girlfriend of Kareem Rush
Hazel Renee 
Jennifer Williams: Ex-Wife of Eric Williams

Episodes

References

2017 American television seasons
Basketball Wives